"Beautiful Life" is a song by British boy band Union J. It was released as on 21 October 2013 as the second single from their debut studio album, Union J (2013).

Background
On 3 September 2013, Union J announced via Twitter the name of their next single would be "Beautiful Life" and will be released on 21 October: "THE WAIT IS OVER! Our brand new single is called ‘Beautiful Life’ and is released on 21st Oct #UnionJBeautifulLife". George Shelley said: "Single 2 is called Beautiful Life, and its my favourite song in the world. Means so much to me, and you'll love it!" The group also commented on the track: "The guitar is back!", and Josh Cuthbert described it as a "mid-tempo song" that "builds throughout". The single officially debuted on 9 September.

Music video
On 4 September 2013, it was reported the band were filming the music video for their new single. In late September, 4Music revealed a behind-the-scenes of the video for "Beautiful Life". The video was filmed in London at a shipping dock as the song progresses young people emerge from the crates and join Union J. The music video officially premiered on 16 September 2013.

Critical reception
Roberts Copsey of Digital Spy gave the song three out of five stars, saying: "As such, Union J's latest single 'Beautiful Life', which encourages people to live life to the fullest - including one insecure girl who lives a 'broken dream' and spades on the make-up 'to cover up an empty space' - feels a touch on the dated side. The jaunty guitar riff, singalong lyrics and arms-aloft chorus are all present and correct, but what is sorely lacking is a dose of youthful charm."

Track listing

Other Versions
 7th Heaven Club Mix - 6:28

Charts

Release history

References 

2013 songs
Union J songs
RCA Records singles
2013 singles
Songs written by Jon Maguire
Syco Music singles